E, or e, is the fifth letter and the second vowel letter in the Latin alphabet,  used in the modern English alphabet, the alphabets of other western European languages and others worldwide.  Its name in English is e (pronounced ); plural ees, Es or E's. It is the most commonly used letter in many languages, including Czech, Danish, Dutch, English, French, German, Hungarian, Latin, Latvian, Norwegian, Spanish, and Swedish.

History

The Latin letter 'E' differs little from its source, the Greek letter epsilon, 'Ε'. This in turn comes from the Semitic letter hê, which has been suggested to have started as a praying or calling human figure (hillul 'jubilation'), and was most likely based on a similar Egyptian hieroglyph that indicated a different pronunciation. The various forms of the Old Italic script and the Latin alphabet followed this usage.

Use in writing systems

English
Although Middle English spelling used  to represent long and short , the Great Vowel Shift changed long  (as in 'me' or 'bee') to  while short  (as in 'met' or 'bed') remained a mid vowel. In other cases, the letter is silent, generally at the end of words like queue.

Other languages
Less commonly, as in French, German, or Saanich,  represents a mid-central vowel .

Other systems
The International Phonetic Alphabet uses  for the close-mid front unrounded vowel or the mid front unrounded vowel.

Most common letter
'E' is the most common (or highest-frequency) letter in the English language alphabet and several other European languages, which has implications in both cryptography and data compression. In the story "The Gold-Bug" by Edgar Allan Poe, a character figures out a random character code by remembering that the most used letter in English is E. This makes it a hard and popular letter to use when writing lipograms. Ernest Vincent Wright's Gadsby (1939) is considered a "dreadful" novel, and supposedly "at least part of Wright's narrative issues were caused by language limitations imposed by the lack of E." Both Georges Perec's novel A Void (La Disparition) (1969) and its English translation by Gilbert Adair omit 'e' and are considered better works.

Related characters

Descendants and related characters in the Latin alphabet
 E with diacritics: Ĕ ĕ Ḝ ḝ Ȇ ȇ Ê ê Ê̄ ê̄ Ê̌ ê̌ Ề ề Ế ế Ể ể Ễ ễ Ệ ệ Ẻ ẻ Ḙ ḙ Ě ě Ɇ ɇ Ė ė Ė́ ė́ Ė̃ ė̃ Ẹ ẹ Ë ë È è È̩ è̩ Ȅ ȅ É é É̩ Ē ē Ḕ ḕ Ḗ ḗ Ẽ ẽ Ḛ ḛ Ę ę Ę́ ę́ Ę̃ ę̃ Ȩ ȩ E̩ e̩ ᶒ
 ⱸ : E with notch is used in the Swedish Dialect Alphabet
 Æ æ : Latin AE ligature
 Œ œ : Latin OE  ligature
 The umlaut diacritic ¨ used above a vowel letter in German and other languages to indicate a fronted or front vowel (this sign originated as a superscript e)
 Phonetic alphabet symbols related to E (the International Phonetic Alphabet only uses lowercase, but uppercase forms are used in some other writing systems):
 Ɛ ɛ : Latin letter epsilon / open e, which represents an open-mid front unrounded vowel in the IPA
 ᶓ : Epsilon / open e with retroflex hook
 Ɜ ɜ : Latin letter reversed epsilon / open e, which represents an open-mid central unrounded vowel in the IPA
 ɝ : Latin small letter reversed epsilon / open e with hook, which represents a rhotacized open-mid central vowel in the IPA
 ᶔ : Reversed epsilon / open e with retroflex hook
ᶟ : Modifier letter small reversed epsilon / open e
 ɞ : Latin small letter closed reversed open e, which represents an open-mid central rounded vowel in IPA (shown as ʚ on the 1993 IPA chart)
 𐞏 : Modifier letter small closed reversed open e, which is a superscript IPA letter
 Ə ə : Latin letter schwa, which represents a mid central vowel in the IPA
 Ǝ ǝ : Latin letter turned e, which is used in the writing systems of some African languages
 ɘ : Latin letter reversed e, which represents a close-mid central unrounded vowel in the IPA
 𐞎 : Modifier letter small reversed e, which is a superscript IPA letter
 The Uralic Phonetic Alphabet uses various forms of e and epsilon / open e:

e : Subscript small e is used in Indo-European studies
 Teuthonista phonetic transcription system symbols related to E:

Ancestors and siblings in other alphabets
 𐤄 : Semitic letter He (letter), from which the following symbols originally derive
 Ε ε : Greek letter Epsilon, from which the following symbols originally derive
 Е е : Cyrillic letter Ye
 Є є : Ukrainian Ye
 Э э : Cyrillic letter E
  : Coptic letter Ei
 𐌄 : Old Italic E, which is the ancestor of modern Latin E
  : Runic letter Ehwaz, which is possibly a descendant of Old Italic E
  : Gothic letter eyz

Derived signs, symbols and abbreviations
 € : Euro sign.
 ℮ : Estimated sign (used on prepackaged goods for sale within the European Union).
 e : the symbol for the elementary charge (the electric charge carried by a single proton)
 ∃ : existential quantifier in predicate logic. It is read "there exists ... such that".
 ∈ : the symbol for set membership in set theory.
 𝑒 : the base of the natural logarithm.

Code points 

 1

Other representations

In British Sign Language (BSL), the letter 'e' is signed by extending the index finger of the right hand touching the tip of index on the left hand, with all fingers of left hand open.

Use as a number
In the hexadecimal (base 16) numbering system, "E" corresponds to the number 14 in decimal (base 10) counting.

"e" is also commonly used to denote Euler's number.

References

External links

ISO basic Latin letters
Vowel letters